The  are located 30 km south of Monbetsu, Abashiri Subprefecture, Hokkaidō, Japan (44° 23' North : 143° 22' East).
The discovery was made in 1915. From then until 1973 when the mine was closed, 73 tons of gold and 1200 tons of silver were produced by the Sumitomo group.

It was one of the richest gold mines in Japan and referred to as "the biggest goldmine in the Orient". At its peak in the 1940s, 13,000 miners, their families, and attendant merchants lived in the area.

See also
 Toi Gold Museum
 Toi gold mine
 Japanese mining and energy resources (World War II)

References

Gold mines in Japan
Silver mines in Japan
Buildings and structures in Hokkaido